The 2004 North Texas Mean Green football team represented the University of North Texas in the 2004 NCAA Division I-A football season.

Schedule

Schedule Source:

References

North Texas
North Texas Mean Green football seasons
Sun Belt Conference football champion seasons
North Texas Mean Green football